Pedro Oliveira may refer to:

 Pedro Oliveira (academic) (born 1971), Portuguese innovation scholar
 Pedro Oliveira (footballer, born 1981), Portuguese footballer
 Pedro Oliveira (swimmer) (born 1988), Portuguese swimmer
 Pedro Henrique Oliveira (born 1992), East Timorese footballer
 Pedro Oliveira (footballer, born 1994), Portuguese footballer
 Pedro Oliveira (photographer) (born 1989), American photographer

See also
São Pedro de Oliveira, a Portuguese parish